Mountain View Stock Farm, now known as Tylord Farm, is a historic estate farm on Vermont Route 22A in Benson, Vermont.  Developed in the early 20th century around a late 18th-century farmhouse, the farm was renowned in the state for its breeding of Kentucky saddle horses and Chester White hogs.  The farm complex also has architecturally distinctive Colonial Revival styling.  The property was listed on the National Register of Historic Places in 1989.

Description and history
Mountain View Stock Farm is located east of the central village of Benson, on a property roughly bisected by Vermont Route 22A, the main north-south route through the community. The buildings of the farm are clustered in three areas along the road, with the main house in the northernmost group. It is a T-shaped two-story wood frame structure, set on the west side of the road, with a gabled roof and clapboard siding. A two-story gabled portico projects in front, supported by slender round columns, a porte-cochere extends to the right, and en enclosed porch, topped by a balustrade, extends to the left. Nearby stand a 20th-century barn and indoor riding arena.

The early history of the farm property is reflective of general trends in the area. First granted in 1788, it was owned in the early 19th century by Chauncey Smith, a prominent local physician and politician. The farm was first used for mixed crop production, and by 1850 was one of the town's most successful dairy farms, at a time when many local farmers were breeding sheep. In 1901 the property was purchased by Charles B. Parsons, president of the St. Joseph Lead Company of Missouri; Parsons' grandfather had been a tenant farmer on the land under Smith. Under Parsons the farm was enlarged and the house given its present Colonial Revival styling. Now reduced to a more modest acreage, it has been used since the 1970s for the breeding of horses.

See also
National Register of Historic Places listings in Rutland County, Vermont

References

Historic districts on the National Register of Historic Places in Vermont
Colonial Revival architecture in Vermont
Buildings and structures completed in 1810
Buildings and structures in Benson, Vermont
Farms on the National Register of Historic Places in Vermont
National Register of Historic Places in Rutland County, Vermont